Claude Bonds Grier (March 24, 1904 – March 1, 1967), nicknamed "Red", was an American Negro league pitcher in the 1920s.

A native of Catawba County, North Carolina, Grier attended North Carolina A&T State University. He made his Negro leagues debut in 1924 for the Washington Potomacs, and split time between Wilmington and the Bacharach Giants the following season. Grier went on to play three more seasons with the Bacharach club, where he spun a historic no-hitter in the 1926 Colored World Series, and finished his career in 1928. He died in Newton, North Carolina in 1967 at age 62.

References

External links
 and Seamheads

1904 births
1967 deaths
Bacharach Giants players
Washington Potomacs players
Wilmington Potomacs players
Baseball pitchers
Baseball players from North Carolina
People from Catawba County, North Carolina
20th-century African-American sportspeople